Saint Joseph's College (SJC) is an independent Roman Catholic co-educational secondary day school, located in Banora Point, near , the Northern Rivers region of New South Wales, Australia. Founded in 1993, the college is administered by the Roman Catholic Diocese of Lismore and associated with the Parish of St Joseph, along with St Joseph's Primary School and St James' Primary School, the latter of which is situated on the same campus.

History

Until the early 1990s, Catholic secondary education beyond the Primary School level in the Tweed Heads region was not possible without travelling some distance south to Mount Saint Patrick's Secondary School, or north to Marymount Secondary School.

In the early 1990s John Bolster, son of a pioneering family in the region and a dedicated Catholic, sold a large portion of undeveloped land in the Banora Point region to the Parish well below market value. The current Parish Priest at the time, James Griffin became an instrumental figure in developing the new school, which was built primarily from funding provided by the congregation of the Catholic Church through ventures such as the Diocesan Investment Fund (DIF), plate collections and other donation schemes.

The college accepted its first group of students in 1993 alongside St James' Primary School, although the official opening of both schools did not occur until 1994. At the time St James contained only Grades Five and Six, from which the students and teachers were simply transported from St Joseph's Primary School, while Kindergarten to Grade Four remained at the St Joseph's Primary campus. Similarly, the college at that time only catered for Year Seven and Year Eight students. Both schools expanded their campuses gradually over the following years, with the inaugural graduation of a Year Twelve grade occurring in 1997.

See also

 List of schools in Northern Rivers and Mid North Coast
 List of Catholic schools in New South Wales
 Catholic education in Australia

References

External links
 St. Joseph's College Website

Educational institutions established in 1993
Catholic secondary schools in New South Wales
1993 establishments in Australia
Education in Tweed Heads, New South Wales